Novokyzylyarovo (Yañı Qıźılyar) is a rural locality (a village) in Lipovsky Selsoviet, Arkhangelsky District, Bashkortostan, Russia. The population was 30 as of 2010. There is 1 street.

Geography 
Novokyzylyarovo is located 23 km northwest of Arkhangelskoye (the district's administrative centre) by road. Asy is the nearest rural locality.

References 

Rural localities in Arkhangelsky District